Ahmed El-Hamy El-Husseini (born 19 March 1939) is an Egyptian former foil fencer. He competed at the 1960, 1964 and 1968 Summer Olympics. At the 1960 Games, he represented the United Arab Republic.

References

External links
 

1939 births
Living people
Egyptian male foil fencers
Olympic fencers of Egypt
Fencers at the 1960 Summer Olympics
Fencers at the 1964 Summer Olympics
Fencers at the 1968 Summer Olympics
Sportspeople from Cairo
20th-century Egyptian people
21st-century Egyptian people